Time on Fire (1961) is the debut collection of poems by Australian poet Thomas Shapcott. It won the Grace Leven Prize for Poetry in 1961.

The collection includes 61 poems by the author that are reprinted from various sources, although some are published here for the first time.

Contents

Critical reception
While reviewing a subsequent volume of poems in The Canberra Times, the critic T. Inglis Moore noted: "In his initial Time on Fire he emerged as a fresh and lively lyricist, with a flexibility of rhythms that reminded one of Dylan Thomas. He tackled urban and rural themes alike with sensitivity and a sharp, reflective intelligence. In his first book and its successors there were, however, certain weaknesses – sometimes the fluidity fell into facility or looseness, the originality into word play for its own sake, the search for meanings into obscurity."

The Oxford Companion to Australian Literature referred to the collection as being "largely autobiographical, reflecting the country boy's distaste for the garish city environment; the wakening of young love; courtship, marriage, parenthood; and a preoccupation with transience."

See also
 1961 in Australian literature
 1961 in poetry

References

Australian poetry collections
1961 poetry books